Interloper is the third studio album by Swedish ambient duo Carbon Based Lifeforms, released in 2010.

Track listing
Interloper starts at track 24, indicating it is a continuation of World of Sleepers.

External links
 Carbon Based Lifeforms official website.
 Review on isratrance.com

2010 albums
Carbon Based Lifeforms albums